ATOMKI is the Institute for Nuclear Research, Hungarian Academy of Sciences. The institute is located in Debrecen and was established in 1954 by Sándor Szalay, the founding director.

ATOMKI became independent from the Institute of Experimental Physics of the Kossuth Lajos University (presently called University of Debrecen), where Sándor Szalay started and directed nuclear physics research for decades. At present, the main research fields of Atomki are atom-, nuclear-, and particle physics, ion beam analytics, technique of detection and signal processing, environmental analytics, radioactive dating, radiochemistry, and solid state physics. The director is Zsolt Dombrádi, D.Sc.

Some of its buildings were originally the National Orphanage for Teachers' Children, built in 1917.

See also
X17 particle

References

Further reading
 Booklet including brief history of the institute (page 7)

External links

1954 establishments in Hungary
Hungarian Academy of Sciences
Nuclear research institutes
Research institutes in Hungary
Organisations based in Debrecen